Fonda de los Tres Reyes was an Inn or Tavern that worked in Buenos Aires in the late 18th century and early 19th. It was the main hotel and restaurant in the city, located in the neighborhood of San Nicolás, populated around 1810 by a considerable number of British and American immigrants.

History 

The establishment was owned by Juan Bonfillo, a Genoese merchant, who had arrived in the port of Buenos Aires in 1790. Bonfiglio had bought the inn in 1802 to a family of Prieto name, Its facilities were located in the street Santo Cristo (current 25 de Mayo) facing the Plaza Mayor, and in the vicinity of Fuerte de Buenos Aires.  

Among his major clients were William Brown and James Florence Burke from Ireland, and some members of Lautaro Lodge. 

During the first British invasion of the River Plate, La Fonda de los Tres Reyes was place of lodging of William Beresford and his officers.

La Fonda de los Tres Reyes was the most exclusive restaurant and hotel in Buenos Aires in the 1800s. This business was in front of the La fonda de Doña Clara, a inn administered by its owner, the English lady Mary Clark.

Notable clients 
 
 Hipólito Vieytes (1762-1815) Argentine politician
 Juan José Paso (1758-1833) Argentine lawyer and politician
 Nicolás Rodríguez Peña (1773-1853) Argentine politician
 Manuel Belgrano (1770-1820) Argentine statesman
 José de San Martín (1778-1850) Argentine patriot.
 Guillermo Brown (1777-1857) Irish Admiral.

References

External links 
 www.revisionistas.com.ar
 Documentos para la Historia Argentina - archive.org
Hotels in Buenos Aires
Types of drinking establishment